Matyas may refer to:

 Mátyás, Hungarian name
 Matyáš, Czech name